Washington Old Hall is a historic manor house in Washington, Tyne and Wear, England. It lies in the centre of Washington, being surrounded by other villages. The building was the ancestral home of the family of George Washington (1732–1799), the first president of the United States.

History

William de Hertburne (originally William Bayard), an ancestor of George Washington, assumed tenancy of the Wessyngtonlands from the Bishop of Durham in the late 12th century. Soon after, he changed his name to William de Wessyngton (later Washington). In the early 15th century Sir William Mallory married Dionysia Tempest, the last Wessyngton heir at the Hall.  Dionysia was daughter of Sir William Tempest and his cousin, Eleanor Wessyngton. In 1613, Sir John Mallory (a descendant of Sir William Mallory and Dionysia Tempest) and Anna Eure, shareholders in the Virginia Company, moved south to Sulgrave Manor in Northamptonshire, and the manor was sold to the Bishop of Durham.

The Hall continued to be used as a residence until the 19th century, when it became tenement flats and gradually fell into disrepair. In 1936 the building was declared unfit for human habitation, and was rescued from demolition by Fred Hill, a local teacher, who created what is now the "Friends of the Old Hall" to press for restoration of the building. Restoration began in 1937. Preservation work stopped during World War II, but was completed in 1955. The building was opened by the American Ambassador, Winthrop W. Aldrich. In 1957 the National Trust assumed responsibility for the building.

As a result of these historic ties, in 2007, Washington, D.C. and the City of Sunderland announced a "friendship agreement," hoping to create cultural and economic ties with one another.

References

Further reading
 
 Margot Johnson. "Washington Old Hall" in Durham: Historic and University City and surrounding area. Sixth Edition. Turnstone Ventures. 1992. . Page 40.

External links

 
 

1180s establishments in England
Grade I listed buildings in Tyne and Wear
Historic house museums in Tyne and Wear
Houses completed in the 17th century
Manor houses in England
Museums in the City of Sunderland
National Trust properties in Tyne and Wear
Rebuilt buildings and structures in the United Kingdom
Stone houses
Washington family residences
Washington, Tyne and Wear